The 1968–69 Cypriot First Division was the 30th season of the Cypriot top-level football league.

Overview
It was contested by 12 teams, and Olympiakos Nicosia won the championship.  AEL Limassol participated in the Greek championship as the previous year's champions. They finished in the 18th position.

League standings

Results

References
Cyprus - List of final tables (RSSSF)

Cypriot First Division seasons
Cypriot
1